Bettis Field was an airstrip in West Mifflin, Pennsylvania, southeast of Pittsburgh, Pennsylvania, established in 1924. It was named for U.S. Army Air Corps Lieutenant Cyrus Bettis following his fatal accident on Jack's Mountain near Bellefonte, Pennsylvania in 1926.

History
Initially a grass strip in a meadow established by local investors Barr Peat, Clifford A. Ball and Bo Phelan, it was gradually improved. Changing hands several times, it was operated by the Pittsburgh-McKeesport Airport Corporation. Curtiss-Wright sold the field to Gus Becker, who operated the Pittsburgh Institute of Aeronautics, which trained engine and aircraft mechanics in downtown Pittsburgh classrooms. During World War II PIA operated under government contracts, delivering training for the military. By 1944 the airstrip was a  paved surface. Sold to Westinghouse in January 1949, the field was closed and redeveloped, becoming the Bettis Atomic Power Laboratory. The two paved runways, used for parking, and two hangars remain. The Art Deco terminal building was razed sometime in the 2000s.

Airlines
 Clifford Ball Airline was a contract carrier for the U.S. Mail between Pittsburgh and Cleveland from July 1, 1925.
 CBA became Pennsylvania Airlines
 Pennsylvania Airlines was merged with Central Airlines becoming Pennsylvania Central Airlines (PCA), "The Capital Airline", eventually becoming Capital Airlines and becoming part of United Air Lines in 1961.
 Transcontinental and Western Air,  TWA, stopped at Bettis Field from 1930 through 1932 as one of eleven stops made on a transcontinental airline service between Los Angeles and New York. Service was then shifted to the Allegheny County Airport.

See also

 History of aviation in Pittsburgh

References

 http://www.airfields-freeman.com/PA/Airfields_PA_SW.htm#bettis
 Richard David Wissolik "Airport Early Days" Part 1
 Homestead & Mifflin Township Historical Society "Bettis: Pittsburgh's first airfield" Homestead & Mifflin Township Historical Society Newsletter April 2002 Volume 2, Issue 4, pp. 3–6

Further reading
 William F. Trimble, "High frontier: a History of Aeronautics in Pennsylvania" University of Pittsburgh Press, 1982 
 W. David Lewis and William F. Trimble, "The airway to everywhere: a history of All American Aviation, 1937-1953" University of Pittsburgh Press, 1988 
 Brian Butko, Paul Roberts, William F. Trimble. "Pittsburgh history" Winter, 1993/94 
 Tony Kambic. "Bettis: the field that brought airmail to Pittsburgh", Clairton, Pennsylvania: The Progress, July 1976 
 Richard David Wissolik; David Wilmes et al. "A place in the sky: a pictorial and spoken history of the Arnold Palmer Regional Airport and aviation in western Pennsylvania" Latrobe, Pennsylvania: The Saint Vincent College Center for Northern Appalachian Studies, 2001  

Defunct airports in Pennsylvania
1949 disestablishments in Pennsylvania
1924 establishments in Pennsylvania
Airports established in 1924
Airports disestablished in 1949
Transportation buildings and structures in Allegheny County, Pennsylvania